Abgarm also known as Ābgarm, Āb-e Garm, Āb Garm, Darmānābād and Īstī Sū) is a village in Kenarporuzh Rural District, in the Central District of Salmas County, West Azerbaijan Province, Iran. At the 2006 census, its population was 598, in 113 families. This village people speaking Azeri.

References 

Populated places in Salmas County